Manuel Villegas (born 26 March 1907, date of death unknown) was a Mexican swimmer. He competed in two events at the 1932 Summer Olympics.

References

External links
 

1907 births
Year of death missing
Mexican male swimmers
Olympic swimmers of Mexico
Swimmers at the 1932 Summer Olympics
People from Xalapa